112 Gripes About the French was a 1945 handbook issued by the United States military authorities to enlisted personnel arriving in France after the Liberation. It was meant to defuse the growing tension between the American military and the locals.

The euphoria of victory over Germany was short-lived, and within months of Liberation, tensions began to rise between the French and the U.S. military personnel stationed in the country, with the former seeing the latter as arrogant and wanting to flaunt their wealth, and the latter seeing the former as proud and resentful. Fights were breaking out more often, and fears were raised, even among high officials, that the situation might eventually lead to a breakdown of civil order.

Set out in a question-and-answer format, 112 Gripes about the French posed a series of well-rehearsed complaints about the French, and then provided a common-sense rejoinder to each of them — the aim of the authors being to bring the average American soldier to a fuller understanding of his hosts.

It has been republished in the United States in 2004, and in France under the title "Nos amis les Français" ("Our friends the French"),  in 2003.

See also 
Anti-French sentiment in the United States
Franco-American relations
Francophobia
Military history of France during World War II
Military of the United States

Sources 
 
 BBC comments on the recent republishing of the handbook.

1945 non-fiction books
Francophobia in North America
Cultural depictions of French people
France–United States relations
Publications of the United States government